Andrew Archer (2 August 1659 – 31 December 1741), of Umberslade Hall, Tanworth in Arden, Warwickshire was a British landowner and Tory politician who sat in the House of Commons in three periods between 1690 and 1722.

Early life

Archer was  baptized on 2 August 1659, the eldest son of Thomas Archer of Umberslade,  Warwickshire  and his wife Anne Leigh, daughter of Richard Leigh of London. His father had been a parliamentary commander during the Civil War.   He matriculated at Trinity College, Oxford on 3 May  1678, aged 18; and was admitted at Inner Temple in 1680. Upon his father's death in 1685 he inherited Umberslade. He married Elizabeth Dashwood, daughter of Sir Samuel Dashwood by licence of 15 June 1693. His wife was connected to Fulke Greville, 5th Lord Brooke, a leading Warwickshire Tory. and the marriage brought him into contact with the world of finance.

Career
Archer was returned in a contest as Member of Parliament for Warwickshire at the 1690 English general election but was relatively inactive. He became a Commissioner for rebuilding Warwick in 1695 and was returned in a contest again at the 1695 English general election. At first he refused to subscribe the Association. He  voted against fixing the price of guineas in March 1696, and voted  against the attainder of Sir John Fenwick on 25 November 1696. In 1697, he introduced and managed a bill to empower  magistrates to order that highways  be widened. He did not stand at the 1698 English general election and spent the next few years to 1700 rebuilding  Umberslade. In 1700 he became deputy lieutenant. He maintained his interest in political affairs in London and Warwickshire, but did not stand for Parliament again until asked to fill the gap at a by-election for Warwickshire on 28 November 1705. He was returned unopposed as a Tory and was active in Parliament. At the 1708 British general election, he was returned unopposed as Tory MP for Warwickshire. He was a teller for the Tories on several occasions and saw through a bill for a new church at Birmingham.  He was active in the matter of Dr Sacheverell and voted  against the impeachment proceedings in 1710. He decided not to stand at the 1710 British general election, but in 1711 was appointed Commissioner in the inquiry into forces and garrisons in Spain, Portugal and Italy. He spent two years in constant travel and uncovered many fraudulent practices in Spain. However he felt his efforts were unappreciated and was disappointed to receive no reward. At the 1713 British general election he was invited to stand by the Warwickshire gentry  and was returned unopposed as Tory MP for Warwickshire again. He was teller for the Tories a few times but was noted as voting with the Whigs on occasion.

Archer was returned again at the 1715 British general election, and supported the opposition until he stood down at the  1722 British general election.

Later life and legacy
Archer became  increasingly indebted, having borrowed to purchase another manor in 1716. He appeared to have devoted  his efforts to building a library.  He died on 31 December 1741 at Umberslade. His children were:
Diana Archer, who married Thomas Chaplin
Thomas Archer, 1st Baron Archer (1695–1768)
Henry Archer (1700–1768), married Elizabeth Montagu, sister of George Montagu, 1st Earl of Halifax
Anne Archer
Elizabeth Archer
Sarah Archer

Archer's sons Thomas and Henry were both  returned to Parliament in 1735.

References

1659 births
1741 deaths
English MPs 1690–1695
English MPs 1695–1698
English MPs 1705–1707
British MPs 1707–1708
British MPs 1708–1710
British MPs 1713–1715
British MPs 1715–1722
Members of the Parliament of Great Britain for English constituencies
People from Tanworth-in-Arden
17th-century English landowners
18th-century English landowners